Sher Mohammed, Mohammad or Muhammad may refer to:

 Ibn-e-Insha (Sher Muhammad Khan) (1927-1978), Pakistani leftist Urdu poet, humorist, travelogue writer and newspaper columnist
 Sher Khan Nashir, hereditary Grand Khan (Loe Khan) of the Kharoti (Ghilzai) tribe and governor of the Kunduz region of Afghanistan in the 1930s
 Sher Mohammad Akhundzada, governor of Helmand in Afghanistan 2001-2005
 Sher Mohammad Karimi (born 1945), Chief of Army Staff in the Military of Afghanistan
 Sher Mohammad Marri (1935-1993), chief of the Marri Baloch tribe in Pakistan